The Rural Municipality of Hanover is a rural municipality (RM) in southeastern Manitoba, Canada, located southeast of Winnipeg in Division No. 2.

It is Manitoba's most populous rural municipality and fourth-most populous municipality overall (behind the cities of Winnipeg, Brandon, and Steinbach) as of the 2021 census.

History
The area of Hanover was part of the traditional lands of the Ojibway-speaking natives. In the summer of 1871, the federal government signed treaties with these people and relocated them to reserves such as the Roseau River Anishinabe First Nation to the south and the Brokenhead Ojibway Nation to the north.

From the lands left behind, the Manitoba government set aside the East Reserve, slightly smaller than what is now the RM of Hanover, for Plautdietsch-speaking Mennonites immigrants from the Russian empire. In 1873, these Mennonites signed an agreement with the Canadian government known as the Privilegium, which guaranteed land, freedom of religion, private schools, and military exemption.

The East Reserve was divided into two municipalities in the early 1880s, as most of the southern Manitoba was organizing itself into new rural municipalities. In 1880, the north part of the East Reserve became the Rural Municipality of Hespeler, named in honour of William Hespeler, who had brought many of the Mennonite immigrants to the area. The RM of Hanover, to the south, was established on 25 May 1881.  The two municipalities shared administrative staff and merged into the single municipality of Hanover in 1890.

Other settlers in the area were mainly French and Anglo-Saxons.

The neighbouring City of Steinbach and Town of Niverville were originally within Hanover but are now separate urban municipalities. Steinbach was first incorporated in 1946 (as a Town) and Niverville in 1969.  Hanover's municipal headquarters were located in Steinbach until a new office building was constructed near Mitchell in 2001.

Demographics 
Hanover is the province's most populated rural municipality, ahead of the Rural Municipality of Springfield, and fourth-most populated municipality overall, slightly behind the City of Steinbach. The largest communities in Hanover are the local urban districts of Mitchell, Grunthal and Blumenort, which have populations of 2,828, 1,782 and 1,778, respectively.

Transportation
Hanover is served by three provincial highways: PTH 52, PTH 12, and PTH 59; the latter two link the municipality with the City of Winnipeg, the provincial capital. There are no major rivers or rail lines running through Hanover; however, the Canadian Pacific Railway's Emerson subdivision forms a portion of the municipality's boundary with the Rural Municipality of Ritchot.

The Steinbach South Airport is a privately-run airport located within municipal boundaries near Steinbach.

Communities 
Local urban districts
Blumenort
Grunthal
Kleefeld
Mitchell
New Bothwell

Other communities
Barkfield
Bristol
Friedensfeld
Hochstadt
Pansy
Randolph
Sarto
Tourond

References

External links
 Official website
 Map of Hanover R.M. at Statistics Canada

Rural municipalities in Manitoba